Akemi Sugiyama (born March 1, 1965) is a Japanese former volleyball player who competed in the 1988 Summer Olympics.

In 1988 she finished fourth with the Japanese team in the Olympic tournament.

External links
 sports-reference.com

1965 births
Living people
Japanese women's volleyball players
Olympic volleyball players of Japan
Volleyball players at the 1988 Summer Olympics